A Special Life is a studio album by British blues musician John Mayall. It was released on 30 May 2014 by Forty Below Records, and it is his first studio album since 2009's Tough.

Track listing

Personnel
John Mayall – vocals, guitars, harmonica, organ, piano
Rocky Athas – guitars
Greg Rzab – bass guitar, percussions
Jay Davenport – drums
C. J. Chenier – accordion, vocals

References

2014 albums
John Mayall albums
Albums produced by John Mayall